Nick Garnett (born October 1964, Liverpool) is an English journalist and radio broadcaster with the British Broadcasting Corporation.  His main role is as the North of England reporter for BBC Radio 5 live, the news and sport network of the BBC.

Biography
Garnett grew up in Liverpool, England. He has worked at a number of local radio stations and joined BBC Radio 5 Live in 1994.

In 1998 he was one of the first field reporters at the BBC to be issued with a Nera M4 Satellite in 1998 which enabled him to operate as a single-person radio broadcaster. His work during the British General Election of 2010 was reviewed in The Daily Telegraph.

In recent years he has moved from using traditional audio recorders to using an iPhone to record, mix and send material from the field to his radio station: known as Mobile journalism. He was one of the first reporters to regularly use a voip application to broadcast live over 3G and wifi networks. He was also one of the first broadcasters to use a live streaming camera application to broadcast live TV pictures for broadcast on the BBC News Channel  from an iPhone.

References

External links
 
 

1964 births
Living people
BBC newsreaders and journalists